The Challenge is a 1948 American film starring Tom Conway as Bulldog Drummond.

Plot
Vivian Bailey travels with Cliff Sonnenberg to visit his uncle, unaware that Capt. Sonnenberg has been flung from a cliff to his death. After a model of a schooner bought by Bulldog Drummond's friend Algy leads to a pursuit of a sunken treasure, Drummond helps bring the co-conspirators, including the captain's housekeeper Kitty Fyffe, to justice.

Cast
 Tom Conway as Bulldog Drummond
 June Vincent as Vivian Bailey
 John Newland as Algy
 Eily Malyon as Kitty
 Richard Wyler as Cliff
 Houseley Stevenson as Capt. Sonnenberg

References

External links
The Challenge at IMDb

Films based on Bulldog Drummond
1948 films
1948 mystery films
American mystery films
American black-and-white films
Films directed by Jean Yarbrough
1940s American films